The 1994 World Rowing Championships were World Rowing Championships that were held from 11 to 18 September 1994 at Eagle Creek Park, Indianapolis, United States.

Medal summary

Men's events

Women's events

Medal table

References

World Rowing Championships
Rowing Championships
Rowing competitions in the United States
1994 in American sports
1994 in sports in Indiana
1994 in rowing
Sports competitions in Indianapolis
1990s in Indianapolis
September 1994 sports events in the United States